Ruth Mackenzie  (born ) is an artistic director of theatres and arts festivals. She has worked extensively in the UK and Europe, and was responsible for the London 2012 Festival. In 2022 she was appointed as artistic director of the Adelaide Festival of Arts in South Australia.

Career
Mackenzie was born in Reading, England, but grew up first in South Africa then in London.

Mackenzie was a drama officer for Arts Council England. She was executive director of Nottingham Playhouse from 1990 until 1997, when she became director of Scottish Opera. She was co-artistic director of the Chichester Festival Theatre from 2003 to 2005, alongside Steven Pimlott and Martin Duncan. She has also been director of the Manchester International Festival.

She was director of the London 2012 Festival, the official cultural programme of the London 2012 Olympics

She was appointed artistic director of the Holland Festival in Amsterdam in 2013, which saw her deliver four festivals from 2015 to 2018. She acted as consultant dramaturg of the Vienna Festwochen.

She became the first female artistic director of the Théâtre du Châtelet in Paris, France, in 2017, but was sacked from the job in August 2020 for reasons that were still unclear years later.

In early 2022 Mackenzie was working with the Mayor of London, Sadiq Khan, on the "Let's Do London" campaign.

In March 2022, she was announced as the artistic director of the Adelaide Festival from its 2023 edition, working with the present co-directors Neil Armfield and Rachel Healy and taking over in mid-2022.

Recognition and awards
Mackenzie was appointed a member of the Order of the British Empire in 1995, and a Commander of the Order of the British Empire for her work on the 2012 London Olympics.

Other roles
Mackenzie has also been a special adviser to five Secretaries of State for Culture, Media and Sport, and has acted as a consultant to the Barbican Centre, the London Symphony Orchestra, Google, the BBC and the Tate Gallery.

Mackenzie was appointed chair of the London Area Council of the Arts Council, with her term running from 1 July 2018 until 30 June 2022, after being nominated by London mayor Sadiq Khan.

References

1950s births
Living people
British arts administrators
Women arts administrators
Commanders of the Order of the British Empire
Year of birth missing (living people)
Opera managers